Ballota nigra, black horehound, is a perennial herb of the family Lamiaceae. It is native to the Mediterranean region and to central Asia and it can be found throughout Europe. It is also naturalized in Argentina, New Zealand, and the Eastern United States. It blooms in the Northern Hemisphere from May to August.

Description
Ballota nigra has a very strong characteristic smell reminiscent of mold or humidity, and can be recognized by its clusters of hairy, reddish-purple flowers. It can grow up to 3 feet in height.

Morphology

Stem and root
It has herbaceous ascending stems, wooden and branched at bottom, covered by down folded hairs. The plant has a taproot system.

Leaves
Leaves are opposite and decussate, and range from oval-lanceolate to heart-shaped, with crenate or dentate border. Leaves, dark green and usually pubescent, measure 3–8 cm per 2–6 cm, and have 1–3 cm petiole. Upper face is wrinkled, with a net-like vein pattern.

Flowers
Flowers are organized in verticillasters, subspherical to about one-sided, with 15 to 30 flowers. Each verticillaster consist of two condensed dichasial cymes at axils of normal leaves.

Flower has an actinomorphic calyx (length 9–10 mm, width 7 mm), made up by five sepals fused together in a tube with five teeths; and a labiate corolla of 12–13 mm, ranging from pink to pale purple to withish. The corolla consist of a tube of about 6 mm and two lips; the upper one slightly concave (like a hood) and externally hairy; the lower one glabrous, with two minor lateral lobes and a major central bifid lobe. There are four didynamous stamens, running parallel under the upper lip, with glabrous filaments and yellow anthers. Ovary is superior, with a single white style and a 2-parted stigma.

Below the calyx there are five filiform bracts, 8 mm long.

Fruit
Each fertilized flower produces a tetrad of black nutlets, cylindrical to ovoid, 2 mm long, partially or fully covered by the calyx. The basal end is flat and attached to the receptacle, while the top end is rounded or pointed.

Biochemistry
Ballota nigra contains diterpenoids like marrubiin, ballonigrin, ballotinone, ballotenol and 7-acetoxymarrubiin. Also, it contains phenylpropanoids.

Taxonomy and etymology
The plant was described by Linnaeus in Species Plantarum (May 1753). The name Ballota comes from the Greek ballo (to reject), because of the strong offensive odor of the plant; cattle will not eat it.  The specific name nigra could refer to the black colour of dried leaves.

The common name comes from the Old English words har, meaning "downy or hoary", and hune, meaning the plant itself. This name refers to the hairs that give the herb its distinctive appearance. In modern times, alternative medicine practitioners have referred to the plant as "seed of Horus" and suggested that horehound takes its name from Horus, the Egyptian sun god.

Distribution and habitat
Ballota nigra is a nitrophilous plant; it grows in ruins, fallows, and hedges at elevations up to 1300 m. It prefers loose, calcareous (alkaline) soils. It tolerates temperatures as low as -5°/-10 °C.

Uses
Usually the plant is used dry and harvested when blooming. Syrups can be made from fresh plants.

Subspecies
Recognized subspecies:
Ballota nigra subsp. anatolica P.H.Davis - Iran, Turkey
Ballota nigra subsp. anomala Greuter - Greece
Ballota nigra subsp. foetida (Vis.) Hayek - central + southern Europe; naturalized in Sweden, Ukraine, Cyprus, Turkey, Argentina
Ballota nigra subsp. kurdica P.H.Davis - Iran, Iraq, Turkey
Ballota nigra subsp. nigra - southern Europe, Great Britain, Sweden, Caucasus, Iran, Turkey; naturalized in Belgium, New Zealand, Argentina
Ballota nigra subsp. ruderalis (Sw.) Briq. - Mediterranean region; Canary Islands, Madeira, Azores
Ballota nigra subsp. sericea (Vandas) Patzak - Albania, Macedonia, Greece
Ballota nigra subsp. velutina (Posp.) Patzak - Slovenia, Croatia; naturalized in Argentina

References

External links

 Comprehensive profile for Ballota nigra from the website MaltaWildPlants.com

nigra
Plants described in 1753
Flora of Europe
Flora of North Africa
Garden plants
Taxa named by Carl Linnaeus
Flora of the Mediterranean Basin